Blonde Fist (or Blond Fist) is a 1991 sports film directed by Frank Clarke and starring Margi Clarke as the protagonist Ronnie O'Dowd, who finds female boxing as an alternative to her domestic problems. The film received a mixed reception.

Plot
Set in Kirkby, Liverpool, the plot centres around Ronnie O'Dowd, a single mother born to a Scottish father who championed in street boxing and her more gentle, ‘ladylike’ mother who dislikes her husband participating in street boxing. 

Ronnie’s mother gives birth to Ronnie in the middle of a street market, on a sack of budgie feed.

After the father of her son is arrested Ronnie struggles to make ends meet against a corrupt social system that treats working class mothers with contempt. 

Ronnie has a keen sense of social justice and defends a neighbouring child from bullies, and the bully’s unrepentant mother - but her quick temper sees her beat up her ex boyfriend’s corrupt social-worker girlfriend and Ronnie is sentenced to 12 months in prison.

Drove by dreams of a better life and to put the pieces of her fractured family life back together to gain a sense of self identity - Ronnie escapes prison with her cellmate and blackmails her ex boyfriend for the funds to get to New York, where her father is said to be living. 

In New York Ronnie meets an American ex-show girl ‘Lovelle’ from Kentucky who works at the hotel where Ronnie’s father works as a kitchen porter and the two women strike up a friendship based on shared cultural experiences. 

Much to her dismay, Ronnie’s father turns out to be an alcoholic, he had told his family he was a successful ‘tycoon’ in NYC.

Ronnie sees a poster whilst out in NYC advertising a club for amateur women boxers.

Ronnie and Lovelle visit ‘Knucklers’ nightclub, where a female boxing match is about to take place. The absence of one of the boxers leads the ring announcer to issue a friendly challenge: £1000 will go to the woman who lasts at least 3 minutes in the ring with his fighter. Ronnie eagerly accepts, intending to lasts the three minutes, but her opponent turns aggressive, forcing Ronnie to knock her out.

Ronnie later receives an invitation for another boxing match from the manager of Knucklers, her and Lovelle convince the club manager to up the winning prize to $10,000. 

Ronnie begs her father to stop drinking and come and support her at the boxing match, promising she will take him home with her and her son if she wins. Ronnie’s father tells her she will never see him again if she goes to fight after promising her mother there would be no more fighting in the family.

Ronnie faces off against a more skilled adversary, Crazy Sue; and before the bell, the announcer tells Ronnie that this is a ten-minute fight, revealing that the bout was arranged to see to it that O'Dowd loses against Sue and thereby not earn the $10,000. Lovelle scoffs at this, confident that Ronnie can defeat Crazy Sue like she did with Helen, her previous opponent, from the night before. The bell rang and for a minute or so, Ronnie seemingly had the upper hand, repeatedly punching her adversary to the ropes but Sue recomposes herself and starts boxing Ronnie back. After getting knocked down twice, Ronnie begins to lose momentum as Sue pummeled her by one of the corner posts - suddenly Ronnie’s father arrives at the club and cheers her on, Ronnie finally manages to knock Sue out and wins the $10,000 prize.

Ronnie, her son and father head back to Liverpool - Ronnie asks Lovelle to come back with her but Lavelle laments she will stay and the two share an emotional farewell.

On the ferry back to Liverpool, Ronnie’s dad gifts her a boxing champion belt he has made for her and they embrace as the ferry speeds back towards the Liver Buildings on the River Mersey.

Cast
 Margi Clarke as Ronnie O'Dowd
 Carroll Baker as Lovelle Summers
 Ken Hutchison as John O'Dowd
 Sharon Power as Mary
 Angela Clarke as Brenda Doyle
 Gary Mavers as Tony Bone
 Jane Porter as Big Alice
 Tina Malone as Mrs Crane
 Susan Atkins as "Crazy Sue"
 Stephen Graham as Young Boy

Reception
The film received a mixed reception from critics.

References

External links
 IMDb.com

1991 films
1990s sports films
British boxing films
1990s English-language films
1990s British films